The 1928 Hamburg state election was held on 19 February 1928 to elect the 160 members of the Hamburg Parliament.

Results

References 

1928 elections in Germany
1928
February 1928 events